San José Guayabal is a municipality in the Cuscatlán department of El Salvador. 

Municipalities of the Cuscatlán Department